Sixers Post Game Live airs after each Philadelphia 76ers game on NBC Sports Philadelphia.  The program features the team's post game press conference, interviews, and game analysis.

Personalities

Host
Amy Fadool

Analysts
Marc Jackson
Jim Lynam
Donyell Marshall (2009–2010)
John Celestand
Gerald Henderson
John Nash (2006- 1 July 2008)

Reporters

Ron Burke
Neil Hartman

References

External links
Comcast SportsNet Philadelphia

Philadelphia 76ers
NBC Sports Regional Networks
Local sports television programming in the United States